Leo Edmund Scherman (born April 2, 1975) is a Canadian film and television director, writer and producer. He is best known as the co-writer and director of the feature film Trench 11, and co-creator of the television series Cock'd Gunns.

Personal life 
Scherman was born in London, England to Canadian artist Tony Scherman and British artist Margaret Priest. His grandfather is Canadian conductor and violinist Paul Scherman and his father-in-law is deep-sea explorer Dr. Joe MacInnis.

In 1997, he graduated from McGill University in Montreal, Quebec, Canada with a degree in Cultural Studies.

Selected filmography

Film

Awards and nominations
He won two Gemini Awards at the 23rd Gemini Awards in 2008 for Cock'd Gunns, for Best Writing in a Comedy Series and Best Ensemble Performance in a Comedy Series.

Trench 11 won the award for Best Feature Film at the Toronto After Dark Film Festival in 2017.

References

External links 

1975 births
Canadian film directors
Canadian male film actors
Canadian male screenwriters
Living people
21st-century Canadian screenwriters